João Lucas de Souza Cardoso (Bela Vista do Paraíso, 8 de Junho de 1991), mais conhecido como João Lucas, é um futebolista brasileiro que atua como lateral-esquerdo. Atualmente está no Náutico.

Career statistics

Honours 
Avaí
Campeonato Catarinense: 2021

References

External links

1991 births
Living people
Sportspeople from Paraná (state)
Brazilian footballers
Association football defenders
Campeonato Brasileiro Série A players
Campeonato Brasileiro Série B players
Campeonato Brasileiro Série C players
Esporte Clube Santo André players
Marília Atlético Clube players
Clube Atlético Linense players
Atlético Clube Goianiense players
Clube Atlético Penapolense players
Paysandu Sport Club players
Associação Chapecoense de Futebol players
Grêmio Novorizontino players
Associação Atlética Ponte Preta players
Figueirense FC players
Ceará Sporting Club players
Avaí FC players
Associação Ferroviária de Esportes players